The Reserve Special Commendation Ribbon was an award of the United States Navy which was authorized for issuance between the years of 1930 and 1941.  The ribbon was established by order of Secretary of the Navy James V. Forrestal in 1946.

The Reserve Special Commendation Ribbon was issued to any officer of the Naval Reserve who had commanded a Naval Reserve Battalion for a period exceeding four years.  To be eligible for the Reserve Special Commendation Ribbon, an officer must also have served longer than ten years in the Naval Reserve as a whole.

The decoration was issued as a one-time-only award, and there were no devices authorized for additional awards of the Reserve Special Commendation Ribbon.  The Reserve Special Commendation Ribbon end date was established on December 7, 1941, in light of the massive expansion and call-up of reserves for duty in World War II.

See also
Awards and decorations of the United States Armed Forces

External links
Part 3 - Special and Commemorative Medals,  Navy and Marine Corps Awards Manual [Rev. 1953].
Decorations, Medals, Ribbons, Badges of the United States Navy, Marine Corps and Coast Guard 1861-1948 U.S. Navy. Bureau of Personnel. 1948.

Awards and decorations of the United States Navy
Awards established in 1930
Military ribbons of the United States